Thomas Friedensen (1879–1931) was an English-born artist, active in Australia.

Friedensen was born at Leeds, England. He studied at the Royal College of Art, South Kensington, and in 1912 had an exhibit in the black and white room at the Royal Academy. Friedensen showed a water-colour and two oils at the 1919, 1920 and 1921 exhibitions. He arrived in Australia in 1921 and was elected an associate of the Royal Art Society of New South Wales in 1922. Friedensen established a reputation as an etcher and is represented in the Sydney, Melbourne, Adelaide and Perth galleries. Friedensen returned to Europe in 1930 and died at Cannes in the south of France in beginning of June 1931.

References

External links
The mountain selection, Burragorang National Library of Australia
Images of 9 etchings by Thomas Friedensen and a list of his exhibitions

1879 births
1931 deaths
20th-century Australian painters
20th-century Australian male artists
20th-century printmakers
Alumni of the Royal College of Art
Artists from Leeds
British emigrants to Australia
Australian printmakers
Australian male painters